Karel Knejzlík (born 23 October 1996) is a professional Czech football left back currently playing for Opava on loan from FC Slovan Liberec.

Youth career 
He started playing football at FK Stráž pod Ralskem before moving to the Slovan Liberec youth setup.

Club career 
He started his professional career at Liberec. He went on an 18-month loan to the Czech National Football League side Varnsdorf in January 2016 and made his competitive debut in their 0–0 draw at Ústí nad Labem on 11 March. He scored his first league goal on 3 March 2017 in Varnsdorf's 1–0 win at České Budějovice. Upon his return to Liberec, he made two league appearances in 2017 before going on loan to another National Football League club, Hradec Králové.

International career 
He represented the Czech Republic in the Under-16, Under-18 and Under-21 youth categories.

References

External links 
 
 Karel Knejzlík official international statistics
 
 Karel Knejzlík profile on the FC Slovan Liberec official website
 Karel Knejzlík profile on the FC Hradec Králové official website

Czech footballers
Czech Republic youth international footballers
1996 births
Living people
Czech National Football League players
Czech First League players
FC Hradec Králové players
FC Slovan Liberec players
SFC Opava players
Association football defenders